This article lists all appointed United States senators since the 1913 ratification of the Seventeenth Amendment to the United States Constitution which established the direct election of senators, as well as means of filling vacant Senate seats.

Text of the Seventeenth Amendment to the United States Constitution

Gubernatorial appointment governing Senate vacancies

Filling vacancies by special election
The following states require Senate vacancies to be filled only by elections and do not allow state governors to fill them through appointments.
 North Dakota
 Oregon
 Rhode Island
 Wisconsin

Filling vacancies by gubernatorial appointment followed by a proximate special election
The following 8 states allow state governors to fill Senate vacancies through appointments. However, a special election must be held within a few months of the vacancy.

 Alaska
 Connecticut
 Louisiana
 Massachusetts
 Mississippi
 Texas
 Vermont
 Washington

Filling vacancies by gubernatorial appointment through the next election
The following 38 states allow state governors to fill Senate vacancies through appointments. An appointed senator may serve out the balance of the term or until after the next statewide general election.

 Alabama
 Arizona
 Arkansas
 California
 Colorado
 Delaware
 Florida
 Georgia
 Hawaii
 Idaho
 Illinois
 Indiana
 Iowa
 Kansas
 Kentucky
 Maine
 Maryland
 Michigan
 Minnesota
 Missouri
 Montana
 Nebraska
 Nevada
 New Hampshire
 New Jersey
 New Mexico
 New York
 North Carolina
 Ohio
 Oklahoma
 Pennsylvania
 South Carolina
 South Dakota
 Tennessee
 Utah
 Virginia
 West Virginia
 Wyoming

Appointments of senators-elect to the Senate

In the past, retiring or defeated senators often resigned after the general election but before the expiration of their term due to various reasons.

One of the common reason was to allow state governors to appoint their successors to the vacated seat. This enabled their successors to gain extra seniority over other freshmen senators for the purposes of obtaining choice committee assignments. This practice ended in 1980 after both parties established new party rules that no longer gave seniority to senators who entered Congress early by being appointed to fill the vacancy just before the end of a Congress. Seniority still counted in obtaining choice of office and parking space assignments.

In the election years of 1966, 1974 and 1978, changes to pension laws made it advantageous for senators to resign before December 31, rather than wait until their term expired in early January, contributing to the increase in the number of appointed senators.

In addition, 3 senators died after the election of their successors, allowing their successors to be appointed and take office early.
 Joseph M. McCormick (Illinois)
 James J. Couzens (Michigan)
 Philip Hart (Michigan)

Number of appointed senators since the ratification of the Seventeenth Amendment
There have been a total of 242 senators appointed to the United States Senate since the 1913 ratification of the Seventeenth Amendment, including 200 appointments made before the next scheduled or special election and 42 appointments made of senators-elect who have already been elected to the seat.

List of individuals appointed to the Senate
The following is a list of individuals appointed to the Senate preceding an election. Only appointments made after the ratification of the Seventeenth Amendment, which established the direct election of senators, are included. The Senate Historical Office does not maintain records of senators who were appointed before the passage of the Seventeenth Amendment.

For a list of senators-elect appointed to the Senate after being elected, see List of senators-elect appointed to the Senate.

Key

List of senators-elect appointed to the Senate
The following is a list of senators-elect appointed to the Senate after being elected. Only appointments made after the ratification of the Seventeenth Amendment, which established the direct election of senators, are included.

Key

See also
 List of special elections to the United States Senate

Notes

References

External links
 Appointed Senators, United States Senate
 Biographical Directory of the U.S. Congress
 U.S. Senate Vacancies: Contemporary Developments and Perspectives, a report produced by the Congressional Research Service

Appointed
Appointed